Dominik Witczak (born 2 January 1983) is a former Polish volleyball player, a member of Poland men's national volleyball team, Polish Champion (2008, 2017).

Personal life
Witczak was born in Ostrów Wielkopolski, Poland. He is married to Anna (née Woźniakowska), who is a former volleyball player. On October 28, 2013 his wife gave birth to their son Antoni.

Career

Clubs
In 2008 moved to ZAKSA Kędzierzyn-Koźle. In 2014 signed new contract with his current club to next 3 seasons. On November 28, 28 after 7th round of regular season in 2015–16 PlusLiga was announced that Witczak played last match in ZAKSA Kędzierzyn-Koźle. He went to Asseco Resovia Rzeszów, because of Jochen Schops injury.

National team
He was appointed to the Polish national team in 2014 by head coach Stephane Antiga.

Sporting achievements

Beach volleyball
 2006  Polish Championship, with Damian Lisiecki
 2008  Polish Championship, with Damian Lisiecki
 2009  Polish Championship, with Damian Lisiecki
 2009  Polish Cup, with Damian Lisiecki
 2010  Polish Championship, with Grzegorz Kliml
 2010  Polish Cup, with Grzegorz Kliml

Clubs

National championships
 2007/2008  Polish Championship, with PGE Skra Bełchatów
 2010/2011  Polish Championship, with ZAKSA Kędzierzyn-Koźle
 2011/2012  Polish Championship, with ZAKSA Kędzierzyn-Koźle
 2012/2013  Polish Cup, with ZAKSA Kędzierzyn-Koźle
 2012/2013  Polish Championship, with ZAKSA Kędzierzyn-Koźle
 2013/2014  Polish Cup, with ZAKSA Kędzierzyn-Koźle
 2015/2016  Polish Championship, with Asseco Resovia Rzeszów
 2016/2017  Polish Cup, with ZAKSA Kędzierzyn-Koźle
 2016/2017  Polish Championship, with ZAKSA Kędzierzyn-Koźle

References

External links 
 PlusLiga player profile

1983 births
Living people
People from Ostrów Wielkopolski
Sportspeople from Greater Poland Voivodeship
Polish men's volleyball players
Polish beach volleyball players
Skra Bełchatów players
ZAKSA Kędzierzyn-Koźle players
Resovia (volleyball) players